Windows 10 October 2020 Update (codenamed "20H2") is the tenth major update to Windows 10 as the cumulative update to the May 2020 Update. It carries the build number 10.0.19042.

Version history
The first preview was released to Insiders who opted in to Beta Channel on June 16, 2020. The update began rolling out on October 20, 2020. Notable changes in the October 2020 Update include:

New theme-aware tiles in Start menu
Improvements to Microsoft Edge
New Chromium-based Microsoft Edge included by default (replaced EdgeHTML-based Microsoft Edge Legacy)
Switch between multiple tabs and Windows apps by pressing 
Quick access to active tabs for pinned sites in the taskbar
Price comparison tool
New personalized out-of-box experience for the taskbar
Improvements to notification experience as well as tablet experience for 2-in-1 PCs
Migrated Control Panel's System Information UI into the Settings About page in the Settings app
Improvements to Modern Device Management (MDM)

See also
Windows 10 version history

References

Windows 10
History of Microsoft
Software version histories